Poul Børge Kops (September 19, 1915 – February 23, 2000) was a Danish boxer who competed in the 1936 Summer Olympics. He was born in Pedersborg, Sorø municipality and was the older brother of Ebbe Kops. In 1936 he finished fourth in the lightweight class. He lost in the semi-finals to the upcoming gold medalist Imre Harangi and was not able to compete in the bronze medal bout with Erik Ågren.

External links
Poul Kops' profile at Sports Reference.com

1915 births
2000 deaths
Lightweight boxers
Olympic boxers of Denmark
Boxers at the 1936 Summer Olympics
Danish male boxers
People from Sorø Municipality
Sportspeople from Region Zealand